Ciaran Bonner is an Irish former Gaelic footballer who played for Glenswilly and the Donegal county team.

Playing career

Club
Bonner was part of the Glenswilly team that won its first Donegal Senior Football Championship in 2011, with a 1–8 to 0–9 victory over St Michael's. He played in the 2007 final which Glenswilly lost. He later moved to the London club Tír Chonaill Gaels.

He also played for Donegal Boston.

He scored a goal in the final of the 2013 Donegal Senior Football Championship following a deft flick of the heel from Michael Murphy. That was Bonner's second Donegal Senior Football Championship. Bonner's team progressed to the final of the Ulster Senior Club Football Championship, which they lost to Ballinderry.

He won a third Donegal SFC in 2016, making a substitute appearance in the final.

He had retired by 2020.

Inter-county
Bonner's Donegal debut came against St Mary's in the Dr McKenna Cup. He played in the 2006 Ulster Senior Football Championship Final at Croke Park. He played many more games in the Ulster Senior Football Championship as well, and made an appearance at the semi-final stage in 2007. That same year he was part of the Donegal team that won the 2007 Dr McKenna Cup, as well as the 2007 National Football League, scoring 0–2 in the final at Croke Park. He was stretchered off the pitch in that game.

Bonner voluntarily left Donegal "for good" following the team's penultimate match of the 2008 National Football League, against Laois, a game in which he was substituted. However, he was then dropped by manager John Joe Doherty over a breach of discipline ahead of the 2009 All-Ireland Senior Football Championship qualifier game against Carlow, having been expected to start that game and having played in the previous game, an Ulster Senior Football Championship defeat to Antrim. Bonner played in the Connacht Senior Football Championship, making his debut for London against Leitrim in June 2012.

According to Keith Duggan — writing in The Irish Times in 2013 — Bonner "was among the most conspicuously talented of the county set-up in the uncertain years before Jim McGuinness took over but was absent for the revolution".

Honours
Donegal
 National Football League: 2007
 Dr McKenna Cup: 2007

Glenswilly
 Donegal Senior Football Championship: 2011, 2013, 2016

References

External links
 Ciaran Bonner profile at gaainfo.com

Year of birth missing (living people)
Living people
Donegal Boston Gaelic footballers
Donegal inter-county Gaelic footballers
Glenswilly Gaelic footballers
Irish expatriate sportspeople in England
Irish expatriate sportspeople in the United States
London inter-county Gaelic footballers
Tír Chonaill Gaels Gaelic footballers